Theloderma corticale (common names: mossy frog, Vietnamese mossy frog, Tonkin bug-eyed frog, moss bug-eyed frog, and [for the formerly recognized Theloderma kwangsiense] Kwangsi warty treefrog) is a species of frog in the family Rhacophoridae. It is found in northern Vietnam, south–central Laos, and southern China (Guangdong, Guangxi, Hainan, Yunnan).

Description 
The common name "mossy frog" arises from the fact that its skin is a mottled green and brown that resembles moss growing on rock, and forms an effective form of camouflage. They have large sticky pads on their toes and a soft underbelly.
This species will curl into a ball when frightened, and play dead.

Habitat 
Its natural habitats are primarily evergreen rainforests and subtropical forest where they have been found inside pools in hollowed logs, placed by the local villagers. It is a semi-aquatic that is found in caves and steep rocky cliffs. Breeding takes place in rock cavities or tree holes.

Diet 
Its diet consists of crickets, cockroaches, and earthworms.

Conservation 
Its habitat is threatened by forest loss. It is also collected for the international pet trade. Like many amphibians, the Vietnamese mossy frog is vulnerable to the chytrid fungus Batrachochytrium dendrobatidis. Nonetheless, the conservation of this species is classified as "Least Concern" by the International Union for Conservation of Nature.

References

External links 
 
 

Theloderma
Frogs of China
Amphibians of Laos
Amphibians of Vietnam
Taxa named by George Albert Boulenger
Amphibians described in 1903
Taxonomy articles created by Polbot